Nationalarenan, currently known as Friends Arena for sponsorship reasons, is a retractable roof multi-purpose stadium in Stockholm, Sweden. Located next to the lake Råstasjön in Solna, just north of the City Centre, it is the biggest stadium in Scandinavia. Since its opening, the venue has served as Sweden's national stadium for men's football, hence the  name Nationalarenan. The main tenants of the stadium are Sweden's men's national football team and Allsvenskan football club AIK; both relocated from their previous home at the Råsunda Stadium. The venue has a total capacity of 65,000 at concerts and 50,000 seated at football matches, but the stadium can be scaled down to provide for smaller events with approximately 20,000 guests.

History 
Initially there were plans to build a new national stadium close to the indoor venue Ericsson Globe in Stockholm, but on 1 April 2006 the Swedish Football Association (SvFF) made the decision to build the new stadium in Solna. It was calculated to cost around 1.9 billion kronor (202 million euro) to complete. The estimated cost before construction had begun was 2.3 billion kronor. It replaced Råsunda Stadium, Sweden's former national arena for football. Råsunda was torn down and replaced by some 700 flats and office buildings.

Swedbank acquired the naming rights to the stadium in a 153 million kronor (about 20.5 million euro) deal that will last until 2023. While the arena was originally to be known as Swedbank Arena, Swedbank announced in 2012 that it would donate its naming rights to Friends, a nonprofit organization against school bullying of which Swedbank is a sponsor. Consequently, the stadium was renamed Friends Arena.

Structure and facilities 
The stadium has a retractable roof, enabling events to take place during the winter season and to host indoor entertainment shows. The facade of the arena can be lit up in 17 million different color schemes. For example, the stadium is lit up in blue and yellow when Sweden's national team is playing matches. Nationalarenan is a UEFA Category 4 stadium, and the natural turf pitch measures 105 x 68 metres. In the middle of the stadium roof, a 240 square metres big media cube is placed where the attendance can follow what is happening. In addition, 647 LED-screens are installed throughout the facility to enhance the guest experience.

Events 

Crown Princess Victoria of Sweden declared the arena inaugurated at the opening ceremony, which took place in the venue on 27 October 2012. The show, directed by famous Swedish director Colin Nutley, was entitled "Svenska ögonblick" (Swedish Moments). Artists like Agnes Carlsson, The Hives, Icona Pop, Loreen, First Aid Kit and Roxette performed in front of a crowd of 46,000 people. Furthermore, 1,700,000 TV viewers watched the inauguration show live at SVT1.

Swedish House Mafia made three concerts during their One Last Tour in the arena. A total of approximately 115,000 people visited Nationalarenan during the three sold-out concerts in November 2012.

On 14 November 2012, the stadium hosted its first football game. Zlatan Ibrahimović scored the first goal at Sweden's new national stadium in the 4–2 victory against England. The game was seen by 49,967 people, which until 2017 was the attendance record for a sport event.

A new record for Swedish bandy was set at the 2013 Swedish Bandy Championship Final, when Hammarby IF defeated Sandvikens AIK ahead of an audience of 38,474 persons under the closed roof.

AIK played their first competitive football match on April 7, 2013. Visiting team Syrianska FC succeeded to get one point after a goalless game, but the better for AIK, they set a new club record attendance for a home game in Allsvenskan of 43,463.

Bruce Springsteen & The E Street Band played three sold-out concerts at Nationalarenan between 3–11 May 2013 on their Wrecking Ball Tour, breaking the venue's attendance records with over 55,000 attendees at each show. In thanking Swedish fans for their long time support and loyalty, Springsteen played full albums during the concerts: Born To Run on 3 May, Darkness on the Edge of Town on 4 May, and Born In The U.S.A. on 11 May.

On 28 July 2013, the final of the UEFA Women's Euro were played. 41,301 people watched Germany overcome Norway with a score of 1–0. The game set a new attendance record for a Women's Euro fixture. Solna became also the first city in Europe which has hosted all four big football championships (FIFA World Cup, FIFA Women's World Cup, UEFA European Championship and UEFA Women's Championship). The arena also hosts Motorcycle speedway as part of the Speedway Grand Prix World Championship series and has hosted the Speedway Grand Prix of Scandinavia since 2013.

The arena also hosted the final of Melodifestivalen every year since 2013 except 2021 because there was no live audience due to COVID–19 pandemic. In 2022 due to Omicron variant, the arena also hosted Heat 4 and the Semi-Final. The stadium was chosen as the venue for the 2017 UEFA Europa League Final in 2015.

Pearl Jam performed at the stadium on 28 June 2014. The show was the kickoff of the European leg of their Lightning Bolt Tour.

AC/DC performed at the venue on 19 July 2015 in front of a sold-out crowd of 53,000 people. On 26 July 2016, Beyoncé performed at the stadium to a sold-out crowd of 48,519 for her The Formation World Tour.

Coldplay performed for a sold out crowd of 53,575 at the stadium on 3 July 2016 as part of their A Head Full of Dreams Tour.

Depeche Mode performed at the stadium on 5 May 2017. The show was the opening night of the band's Global Spirit Tour in front of a sold-out crowd of 36,400 people. Ariana Grande performed here on 8 May 2017. The show was the kickoff of the European leg of her Dangerous Woman Tour.

Celine Dion will bring her Courage World Tour to the stadium on 30 September 2023. 

The stadium was the venue for the 2017 UEFA Europa League Final on 24 May 2017 between Ajax and Manchester United; United won the match 2–0. Guns N' Roses performed here on 29 June 2017 in a sold-out show to a crowd over 55,000 people, approximately 1,000 people less than Bruce Springsteen who holds the record.

On 5 December 2019, the Tim Bergling Foundation held the Avicii Tribute Concert for mental health awareness with acts such as David Guetta, Kygo, Aloe Blacc, and Rita Ora performing. The concert broke the attendance record of Nationalarenan. A total of 58,163 people attended.

On 21 July 2022, Lady Gaga performed here during The Chromatica Ball Tour in front of a crowd of 34,934 people.

Points of interest 

The stadium is located a 700-metre (800 yards) walk from the Solna commuter train station, where the Tvärbanan tramway and local buses are also available (a slightly longer walk away). The 18th meridian east runs through Nationalarenan. There are two boards informing that the eighteenth meridian has passed through this point, at the entrance B and F.

The arena, located about six km (3,7 miles) from Stockholm Central Station, has parking for 300 charter buses and 4,000 cars. Along with the stadium, there will also be built a number of hotels with a total of approximately 400 rooms, restaurants for 8,000 guests, office areas for 10,000 employees, conference/exhibition centres and 2,000 flats. Moreover, a shopping mall, Mall of Scandinavia, with 240 shops and a multi screen cinema, opened near the stadium in 2015. The mall is the biggest shopping centre in Sweden.

The total project was calculated to cost more than 4 billion SEK.

Football average attendances

See also 
 List of indoor arenas
 List of indoor arenas in Nordic countries
 List of football stadiums in Sweden
 Climate Pledge Arena, an indoor arena in Seattle, Washington, US that received its name via a similar donation of naming rights
 Kentucky Proud Park, a baseball park in Lexington, Kentucky, US that received its name via a similar donation of naming rights

References

External links 

Friends Arena
Swedish Football Association
Stadium Guide Article

AIK Fotboll
National stadiums
Retractable-roof stadiums in Europe
Football venues in Sweden
Bandy venues in Sweden
Multi-purpose stadiums in Sweden
Buildings and structures in Stockholm County
UEFA Women's Euro 2013 venues
Sports venues completed in 2012
Football venues in Stockholm
Swedish Bandy Final venues
2012 establishments in Sweden
Solna Municipality
Outdoor arenas
UEFA Women's Championship final stadiums
Speedway venues in Sweden